Kentucky Route 19 is a   state highway in Kentucky that runs from US 62 at the Harrison/Robertson County line to KY 8 in Augusta.

Route description

KY 19 straddles the Harrison/Robertson County line for  before entering into Bracken County, where it forms a junction with KY 2897. Southwest of Brooksville, KY 19 joins KY 10. KY 19 leaves KY 10 in Brooksville and continues north junctioning with KY 9/AA Highway before entering Augusta and ending at KY 8.

Major intersections

References

0019
Transportation in Harrison County, Kentucky